The 2021 Bol Open was a professional tennis tournament  played on outdoor clay courts. It was the fifteenth edition of the tournament and part of the 2021 WTA 125K series. The tournament could not be held in 2020 due to Covid-19 pandemic. It took place in Bol, Croatia, from 7 to 12 June 2021.

Singles main draw entrants

Seeds 

 1 Rankings as of 31 May 2021.

Other entrants 
The following players received a wildcard into the singles main draw:
  Jana Fett
  Ana Konjuh
  Tena Lukas
  Tereza Mrdeža 

The following players received entry using protected rankings:
  Alexandra Dulgheru
  Priscilla Hon

The following players entered the singles main draw through qualification:
  Alexandra Cadanțu
  Dalma Gálfi
  Ekaterine Gorgodze
  Lulu Sun

Withdrawals 
Before the tournament
  Eugenie Bouchard → replaced by  Ysaline Bonaventure
  Elisabetta Cocciaretto → replaced by  Irina Bara
  Varvara Gracheva → replaced by  Renata Zarazúa 
  Anna Kalinskaya → replaced by  Olga Govortsova
  Danka Kovinić → replaced by  Priscilla Hon
  Bernarda Pera → replaced by  Usue Maitane Arconada
  Rebecca Peterson → replaced by  Katarina Zavatska
  Sara Sorribes Tormo → replaced by  Katarzyna Kawa 
  Patricia Maria Țig → replaced by  Barbara Haas
  Zhu Lin → replaced by  Claire Liu
  Tamara Zidanšek → replaced by  Nuria Párrizas Díaz

Retirements
  Greet Minnen
  Katarina Zavatska

Doubles entrants

Seeds 

 1 Rankings as of 31 May 2021.

Champions

Singles

  Jasmine Paolini def.  Arantxa Rus 6–2, 7–6(7–4)

Doubles

  Aliona Bolsova /  Katarzyna Kawa def.  Ekaterine Gorgodze /  Tereza Mihalíková 6–1, 4–6, [10–6]

References

External links 
 Official website 

2021 WTA 125 tournaments
2021 in Croatian tennis
Croatian Bol Ladies Open
June 2021 sports events in Croatia